The Rockford Raptors were an American soccer team based in Rockford, Illinois. The team began in the USISL and moved to the USISL Pro League in 1995. In 1999, the team was relegated to the Premier Development League.

The Raptors are now a soccer club for boys and girls U8-U19. The Raptors produced a player that was in the Residency program for the USA. The player's name is Peri Marosevic. They are also associated with the National Premier Soccer League.

Coaches
 Jorge Espinoza 1994
 Glen Tourville 1995
 Roland Hahn 1996–1998
 Dave Huson 1999
Frank Mateus 1999–2000

External links

1994 establishments in Illinois
Association football clubs established in 1994
Defunct Premier Development League teams
Soccer clubs in Illinois
USL Second Division teams
Sports in Rockford, Illinois